The men's 2 miles steeplechase event at the 1934 British Empire Games was held on 7 August at the White City Stadium in London, England. It was the last time steeplechase was contested at the Games until 1962.

Results

References

Athletics at the 1934 British Empire Games
1934